Soviet Philatelist or Sovetskii Filatelist was a Soviet central philatelic magazine published in 1922–1932 by the All-Russian Society of Philatelists. For a number of years, in 1925 and in 1928–1932, its name was changed to Soviet Collector or Sovetskii Kollektsioner.

History 
By 1922, shortly after the Civil War, a number of magazines and pamphlets for collectors appeared in Soviet Russia:
 Russkii Kollektsioner (Russian Collector), published in Novocherkassk,
 Priural'skii Kollektsioner (Ural Collector),
 Krymskii Kollektsioner (Crimean Collector), etc.

However, centralisation of collectors' organisations and periodicals was wanted:

By 1924, these local magazines eventually closed down. In September 1922, the new magazine, Soviet Philatelist, first saw print in Moscow. Its founder and editor was Feodor Chuchin, the Commissioner for Philately and Scripophily.

In 1925, the magazine name was changed to Sovetskii Kollektsioner. The magazine was published biweekly. It was edited by V. A. Bessonov at that time.

In 1926 three magazines, Sovetskii Filatelist, Sovetskii Kollektsioner and Radio de Filintern, were combined. They began to be published under one cover. Their individual lineal numeration was preserved. The last combined issue came out in December 1927.

In the first half of 1928, the cover of the combined issues was only under one title, Sovetskii Filatelist. In July 1928, the magazine was renamed to Sovetskii Kollektsioner. It was published by the Soviet Philatelic Association and the All-Russian Society of Philatelists. The last issue appeared in December 1932.

See also

Notes

References

Further reading 
  Archived from the original and another source on 2015-05-15.

External links 
 
 

Philately of the Soviet Union
1922 establishments in Russia
Magazines established in 1922
Magazines disestablished in 1932
Philatelic periodicals
Monthly magazines published in Russia
Biweekly magazines
Russian-language magazines
Magazines published in the Soviet Union
Hobby magazines
1932 disestablishments in the Soviet Union